Ibis (or Ibis Red; stylised as ibis) is a French brand of economy hotels owned by Accor. Created in 1974, Ibis became Accor's economy megabrand in 2011 with the launch of Ibis Styles and Ibis Budget. As of December 2019, there were 1,218 hotels under the Ibis brand (excluding Styles and Budget hotels), with 155,678 rooms in total across 67 countries.

History 
The first Ibis hotel opened in Bordeaux in 1974. It was created by the Accor group (then Novotel-SIEH) to engineer more affordable Novotels. By 1988, Ibis operated 182 hotels in France.

In the USA, the first Ibis hotel opened in 1983. The chain spread through the states of Texas, Florida and Georgia. However, by the end of the 1980s, Ibis exited the US market. In the UK, by 1995, Ibis operated 8 hotels.

In 1997, Ibis launched its 15-minute guarantee program which consisted in offering the stay if an Ibis hotelier could not fix a customer's issue with a room within 15 minutes.

By 2004, Ibis operated 700 hotels in 36 countries. From 2003 to 2005, Ibis opened in South Korea, China and Thailand. In October 2009, Ibis reached the 100,000 rooms milestone and opened its first hotel in Moscow, followed by a 50th hotel in Brazil and a first hotel in Japan. In 2012, Ibis' largest hotel in the Asia-Pacific region opened.
In September 2011, Accor rebranded All Seasons into Ibis Styles, and Etap Hôtel into Ibis Budget, turning Ibis into the group's economy megabrand. The mattresses, pillows and digital access were upgraded. Following this restructuring, the Ibis megabrand (including both other chains) became the biggest hotel operator in Europe in 2013, with 1,277 hotels. In January 2014, Ibis itself opened its 1,000th hotel.

In September 2012, Ibis tested Sleep Art, a robot that made a painting based on the movements, sounds, and heat variations of the sleeper. Sleep Art was turned into a mobile app for all Ibis customers 6 months later.

Development

Awards 
 2013, 2014: Award for Development at the Global Lodging Forum
 2012, 2014: Best Communication Campaign by the Worldwide Hospitality Awards

See also

 Accor
 Ibis Styles
 Ibis Budget

References

External links
 Official website

Accor
Hotels established in 1974
French brands